Stella Glow is a turn-based role-playing game developed by Imageepoch for the Nintendo 3DS. It was released in Japan by Sega, in North America by Atlus USA, and in Europe and Australia by NIS America in March 2016. Its story centers around a young man who must journey to unite four witches so he can save his home town from destruction. It was the last game developed by Imageepoch before the company filed for bankruptcy.

Gameplay
Gameplay is divided into different areas, free time and battle time. During either players have the ability to purchase items and fight random monsters, however there are certain things that can only be accomplished via free time and battle time. In free time players are given three opportunities to build relationships with their teammates, perform odd jobs, or explore the surrounding area. They are also given the opportunity to "tune" the witches, a process that becomes necessary when personal strife would prevent the player from increasing their relationship with the respective witch. Doing any of these things will cause time to pass and the extent to which a player develops a relationship can impact the game's ending. Engaging in battle time will progress the game's story. Battles are turn based and the extent of a character's abilities can depend greatly on how close Alto is to the person, as a closer relationship or friendship can allow the character to unlock various abilities.

Plot

The protagonist Alto is a young man suffering from amnesia. He has managed to find a home in Mithra Village with his friend Lisette, however their happiness is destroyed when the Witch of Destruction, Hilda, arrives and turns the village - and almost everyone in it - into crystal via song, something that only witches can do. Alto and Lisette are initially spared from this fate but are soon confronted by Hilda. In her grief Lisette transforms into the Water Witch using a mysterious crystal Alto gave her as a birthday gift. Just as their fight with Hilda comes to a climax, Alto and Lisette are saved by the Regnant Knights, who fight on behalf of the land's Queen Anastasia. They're brought to the capital where they discover that Hilda has been crystallizing people all over the country and that if not stopped, she will crystallize everything. In order to stop her Alto must bring together four witches, each of which personify the four elements, and have them sing a song called the Anthem that will undo Hilda's efforts. During this process Alto finds that he is no ordinary young man, as he is a Conductor, an entity with powers that can fine-tune and amplify the witches' songs. In addition, he learns that witches' powers stem from special crystals called Qualia, and the crystal he gifted to Lisette happened to be the Water Qualia. Alto also befriends a young girl named Marie.

Alto and Lisette then set out with the Regnant Knights, led by their captain, Klaus, to search for the remaining three witches. They eventually find the Wind Witch Popo who was acting as the protector of Port Noir, the Fire Witch Sakuya who is the priestess of Amatsu, and the Earth Witch Mordimort who is the sole survivor of the destroyed city of Kashmistan. Along the way, they are constantly harassed by Hilda and her followers, who attempt to assassinate the witches and claim that they are trying to protect the world in doing so. In some of these battles, Alto and the witches are assisted by Angels, strange alien beings that are hostile to Hilda. Eventually, Alto is able to bring all four witches to the capital, where they begin the ritual to sing the Anthem. Hilda arrives to try and stop the ritual, but is too late. As the Anthem is sung, the crystallized people are returned to normal. However, Angels suddenly attack the capital and Klaus reveals he is in league with the Angels when he assassinates Anastasia. Klaus reveals he is actually Xeno, a companion of the legendary hero Elcrest who saved humanity 1000 years ago. After Xeno and the Angels withdraw, the entire kingdom of Regnant is left in chaos. Hilda surrenders to Alto and reveals that she is in fact the fifth witch, the Time Witch, and is also one of Elcrest's companions. In addition, Alto is actually Elcrest himself, having been hibernating for the past 1000 years.

Hilda further explains the history of the world. Thousands of years ago, humanity developed the technology to convert emotional energy into physical energy, but eventually began abusing that knowledge to wage war on each other. The negative emotions the endless wars generated then spawned a godlike being, the Mother Qualia. Influenced by humanity's negative emotions, Mother Qualia was convinced humanity sought its own destruction and began the Eclipse, and apocalyptic event where she wiped out the majority of humanity. Whenever humanity's numbers grew to the point their combined emotional energy became a threat, Mother Qualia would awaken from hibernation and perform the Eclipse. The witches are in fact her way of observing humanity and they would sing the Anthem to trigger the Eclipse. Then, 1000 years ago, Elcrest traveled to the Moon to destroy Mother Qualia. While he was able to stop the Eclipse, he was unable to defeat Mother Qualia. Instead, he was corrupted by her power and had to be put into hibernation until he could be purified by the Water Qualia. Hilda used her time powers to stop her own aging so she could protect the world until Elcrest's return. Xeno was meanwhile captured by Mother Qualia and corrupted into becoming one of her agents, returning to Earth as Klaus. When the next Eclipse was imminent, Hilda believed the only way to delay it was to crystallize humans to prevent their emotions from awakening Mother Qualia.

With this new knowledge Alto resolves to travel to the Moon to confront Mother Qualia himself, and the five witches begin to learn the Celestial Hymn, which is supposed to weaken Mother Qualia. As the rest of his companions prepare for the upcoming campaign, Alto decides to tune himself and reawakens his memories as Elcrest. Marie is then revealed to be an Angel herself, and is actually a piece of the Mother Qualia itself. Marie's sister Eve, who represents the Mother Qualia, then kidnaps Marie with the intent to merge her back into herself. Alto and his companions travel to the Moon and kill Xeno when he attempts to repel their assault. They then confront Eve and weaken her with the Celestial Hymn, leaving her open to attack. Marie pleads with Alto to kill both her and Eve to end Mother Qualia's threat once and for all. Depending on whether the player raised their affinity with Klaus to rank 2, the player is then left with the choice of killing or sparing Eve.

If Alto chooses to follow Marie's wishes and kill Eve, Mother Qualia is destroyed, but at the cost of Marie's life. The Eclipse is stopped and the Angels disappear. Alto and his companions return to Earth victorious, though the guilt of being unable to save Marie hangs over them. However, Alto is confident that as long as positive emotions exist, Marie will return someday. In a post-credits scene, an unknown woman will chastise the player saying that a different ending that saves everybody is possible. This is the default ending if the conditions for the true ending are not met.
If Alto refuses to follow Marie's wishes and spares Eve, he instead attempts to tune her, reasoning that the Mother Qualia is essentially still a Qualia. By doing so, he awakens Cartesia, the personification of all of humanity's negative emotions. Gathering the positive emotions of all of the people they have helped, Alto and his companions unleash the true Celestial Hymn on Cartesia, weakening her enough to defeat her. Eve herself finally begins to feel the positive emotions of humanity and ends the Eclipse, intending to go to Earth with Marie and Alto. However, Cartesia refuses to admit defeat and attempts to crash the Moon into Earth. In order to protect humanity, Eve decides to stay behind on the Moon to keep it from falling. Even though she will be forced to stay on the Moon forever, she assures Alto that she will continue to watch over humanity as a benevolent god this time. Alto and his companions return to Earth as heroes, with Lisette telling everybody Eve's story so that humanity will not repeat its mistake.

In addition to the ending, there is also a special epilogue that varies depending on the character Alto has the highest affinity with.

Development
Imageepoch trademarked the name Stella Glow in August 2014. The game was designed as a celebration to commemorate a decade of the company's history. The game was initially planned to be self-published by Imageepoch, however, publishing rights went to Sega instead. A portion of the game's soundtrack was written by Yasunori Mitsuda.

Reception 

Stella Glow received "generally favorable reviews" according to review aggregator Metacritic. The game holds a 78.78% rating based on twenty-three reviews at GameRankings. According to Famitsu, the title sold over 16.875 copies in its first week on the Japanese market. It sold approximately 22.294 copies during its lifetime in Japan.

References

External links 
 

2015 video games
Atlus games
Fantasy video games
Image Epoch games
Nintendo 3DS games
Nintendo 3DS eShop games
Nintendo 3DS-only games
Sega video games
Tactical role-playing video games
Video games about witchcraft
Video games scored by Yasunori Mitsuda
Video games developed in Japan
Single-player video games